Cricklade is a town and civil parish on the River Thames in north Wiltshire, England, midway between Swindon and Cirencester. It is the first downstream town on the Thames. The parish population at the 2011 census was 4,227.

History
Cricklade was founded in the 9th century by the Anglo-Saxons, at the point where the Ermin Way Roman road crossed the River Thames. It was the home of a royal mint from 979 to 1100; there are some Cricklade coins in the town museum. The Domesday Book of 1086 records a settlement at Crichelade, with a church, and at the centre of a hundred of the same name.

Anglo-Saxon fortification 
Cricklade is one of thirty burhs (boroughs, i.e. fortresses or fortified towns) recorded in the Burghal Hidage document, which describes a system of fortresses and fortified towns built around Wessex by King Alfred. Recent research suggests these burhs were built in the short period 878–879 to defend Wessex against the Vikings under Guthrum, and to act as an offensive to the Viking presence in Mercia. Cricklade was an important part of these defences, being a short distance down Ermin Way from Cirencester, where the Vikings made their base for a year. According to the Anglo-Saxon Chronicle, completion of this system precipitated the retreat of the Vikings from Mercia and London to East Anglia in late 879.

The square defences of the fortification have been excavated in several places on all four sides since the 1940s, possibly making them the most extensively sampled fortification of the period. In the initial phase, a walkway of laid stones marked the rear of a bank of stacked turfs and clay which had been dug from three external ditches. In the second phase, the front of the bank, which after only a short time probably became degraded, was replaced by a stone wall. This wall enclosed the defences on all four sides, considerably strengthening the defensive capabilities of the burh. It has recently been suggested the stone wall was inserted in the 890s. Other burhs of the Burghal Hidage were also strengthened with stone walls, which suggests this was part of a systematic upgrade of the defensive provisions for Wessex, ordered by the king.

The third phase is marked by systematic razing of the stone wall, which was pulled down over the inner berm (the space between the wall and the inner ditch). The stones were used to fill the inner two ditches, which shows the process was deliberate. A similar phase can be seen in the archaeological record at Christchurch, Dorset, another burh of the Hidage. Observations at other burhs suggest this phase of destruction was implemented over the whole of Wessex as a concerted policy, again, by inference, on the part of the king. The destruction may be linked to the accession of King Cnut in the early 11th century, to prevent the burhs being seized and used against him by his rivals.

The fourth phase is marked by reuse of the original Anglo-Saxon defences by inserting a timber palisade along the line of the original wall. This probably marks a renewal of the defences of the town during the civil war of 1144 under King Stephen.

There is little archaeological evidence of the community protected by these defences in the Saxon period, although there are signs that streets were laid out in a regular fashion behind the main north–south High Street. A gate in the northern line of the defences led to a causeway over the flood plain of the Thames and a bridge over the river, which was probably of a defensive nature.

Other settlements 
Widhill, south-east of Cricklade beyond the River Ray, had two small estates at the time of Domesday Book and was later a tithing of St Sampson's parish, Cricklade. In 1934 the boundary of Cricklade parish was redrawn along the river, transferring the Widhill area into Blunsdon St Andrew parish (since 2017, St Andrews parish).

Later history 
On John Speed's 1611 map of Wiltshire, the town's name is recorded as Crekelade. Cricklade Museum houses several publications recounting further historical details of the town and its people.

The Jubilee Clock, on a cast-iron pillar, stands at a road junction on the High Street. It was erected in 1897 to mark Queen Victoria's Diamond Jubilee.

Governance
The civil parish elects a town council. It is in the area of Wiltshire Council unitary authority, which performs most of the major local-government functions.

Outlying hamlets in Cricklade parish are Calcutt, Chelworth Lower Green, Chelworth Upper Green, Hailstone Hill and Horsey Down.

There is an electoral ward with the name of Cricklade and Latton, which combines Cricklade parish with its neighbours to the north east: Latton and Marston Maisey. The ward population recorded in the 2011 census was 4,982.

The parish is in the North Wiltshire parliamentary constituency. From 1295 the Cricklade constituency returned two members of parliament. This parliamentary borough represented just the town until 1782, when its boundaries were extended into the surrounding countryside. It later came to include Swindon, then a village. In 1885, Cricklade became a county constituency electing a single member. Cricklade constituency was abolished in 1918, with the town joining Chippenham, which was renamed to North Wiltshire in 1983 and had its boundaries redrawn in 2010, when Chippenham was given its own seat.

Sport and pastimes

Rugby Union 
The club was founded in 1992 by ex-school players from many schools, meeting at the bar of the Vale Hotel, Cricklade, then owned by ex-President and life members the Ross family. Initially players were committed to other clubs, so Sunday fixtures were played, the first one against Aldbourne on 6 September. In its second season the fixtures moved to Saturdays. The club joined the Dorset and Wilts leagues in 1994, but withdrew as the travelling involved was too burdensome. They were able to rejoin in 2001 when the leagues were re-structured into North and South.

The club originally used pitches from Prior Park School and the Duke of Gloucester Barracks. Since 2001 it has played on a prepared pitch in the town leased by the Town Council. The first game to be held there was between Cricklade and the President's Select XV squad from all rival clubs – about a dozen clubs formed the squad, who played in Gloucester jerseys donated for the day by Gloucester RFC.

Over the years Cricklade Rugby Club has toured over England, West and South Wales and Ireland, with teams spanning a broad range of levels of skill and age category.

Shows and festivals 
The Cricklade Show is held each summer, typically featuring music, dancing and a cricket match.

The town holds an annual festival, usually taking place on Father's Day in June.

Charity sports 
Run annually in the first Sunday of October, the Cricklade Fun Run hosts a half marathon, 10 km and Fun Run event for around 750 runners. This raises funds for a number of local charities.

The Cricklade Triathlon runs in the summer for both adults and juniors.

Leisure centre 
Towards the end of 2006, North Wiltshire District Council proposed closing the leisure centre. After a campaign, the local residents took over the running of the centre and were successful in turning its fortunes. It has a swimming pool, squash courts, sports hall with a range of markings, tennis/five-a-side football courts, a bar and lounge area with balcony and barbecue, a skate park, and children's play areas. In 2009 money was raised for a climbing wall.

Cricket 
Cricklade Cricket Club was established in 1877 and has been located since 1947 on the north side of Cricklade, where its ground (Southam) is next to the River Thames. For the 2016 season the club is running two senior Saturday teams, a friendly Sunday team, a midweek team and three youth teams (U15, U13 and U11s), all in the local Cotswold District Cricket Association leagues.

Association football 
Cricklade Town F.C. is a non-League football team which plays at the Cricklade Leisure Centre.

Cricklade Youth Football Club provides and promotes the playing of association football for the youth of Cricklade from U7s to U16s. The club was the first in Wiltshire to gain the Wiltshire FA Charter Standard, an award for clubs across the country that meet the high standards required by the Football Association.

Cricklade cinema 
Since Autumn 2013, Cricklade Town Hall has shown films every 4th Tuesday of the month from September to April. They include recent releases, classics, and non-mainstream films.

Nature

North Meadow 
North Meadow is a large nature reserve which preserves some 80 per cent of Britain's wild snake's head fritillaries in its . The meadow lies between the Thames and the Churn, which create a unique habitat for the fritillary by winter flooding. Such meadows were once common in Britain, but many were drained and ploughed for arable crops from the 1730s onwards. North Meadow escaped this owing to preservation of its court leet, the Saxon system of town governance that ensured the land was held in common. The site is now managed by Natural England, with support from the court leet.

Blakehill 
It rears a small quantity of organic grade beef, usually from rare breeds such as English Longhorns.

Cotswold Water Park 
Cricklade lies between the east and west sections of Cotswold Water Park, an extensive nature reserve formed from disused gravel pits.

Schools

St Sampson's C of E Primary School 
The state primary St Sampson's Church of England School was linked with the major local landmark, the Anglican St Sampson's parish church. It was divided in 1979 into two schools on the same Bath Road site: St Sampson's Infants' School, for ages 4–7, and St Sampson's C of E Junior School, for ages 7–11. In 2014, the schools merged again to form St Sampson's C of E (VC) Primary School.

Cricklade Manor Preparatory School 
This private school is non-selective and has around 200 pupils aged 3–13. It is housed in the late 19th-century Manor House, which until 2017 housed a prep school linked to Prior Park College, Bath.

Former schools 
Meadowpark School was an independent school established in 1996 for children aged 4–11, which closed in 2021. It was housed in the former St Mary's School, built in 1860 just south of the Town Bridge.

Churches

Anglican 

St Sampson's is the town's Church of England parish church. Dating back to the 12th century, it is dedicated to the 5th-century Welsh saint, Samson of Dol. The present building rests on the remains of another, Saxon church of AD 890. The main part was built in 1240–80, although on closer inspection, the earlier work can still be seen. The large tower with four corner pinnacles, the dominant landmark of the town, was built in 1551–1553 by John Dudley, 1st Duke of Northumberland, father-in-law to Lady Jane Grey. The church is a Grade I listed building.

Roman Catholic 

Since 1984, St Mary's Church has been leased by the Catholic congregation, after it was declared redundant by the Church of England in 1981. The building is Grade II* listed.

Standing just inside the Saxon town wall, it dates from the 12th century and has a low tower completed about 1400. St Mary's had its own small parish, the northern part of the town and its environs, until 1952, when it was united with St Sampson's.

The churchyard, south of the church, contains a complete 14th-century limestone cross, a Grade I listed structure.

United Church 
Cricklade United Church, Calcutt Street, was built by Congregationalists in 1878, in front of a small meeting house of 1799 which is now the church hall. The congregation joined the United Reformed Church on its formation in 1972 and later merged with Methodists as Cricklade United Reformed and Methodist Church.

Former Methodist chapels 
Primitive Methodists built a hall in Calcutt Street, near the High Street, in 1855, and the Wesleyans built theirs just north of the town bridge, near the Priory, in 1870.

In 1938 the two churches united and used the Calcutt Street hall. The Priory building was at first a Sunday school, then after the Second World War was taken over by Wiltshire County Council Education Department, and is now a community hall called Thames Hall. The Calcutt Street building became a doctors' surgery after the move to the United Church.

Motto, blooms and twinning
Cricklade's Latin motto In Loco Delicioso means "in a pleasant place". In 2008 the town was awarded Best Small Town in UK in the Royal Horticultural Society's Britain in Bloom Finals and in 2011 the Champion of Champions award in the Britain in Bloom competition.

Cricklade has been twinned with the French town of Sucé-sur-Erdre since 1990. In June 2010 the 20th anniversary was celebrated in Cricklade. Sucé lies just north of Nantes in the Loire Valley,  from the Atlantic coast. Visits are exchanged in alternate years. Cricklade Twinning Association also holds social events to raise funds towards hosting the visits by Sucé to Cricklade.

Saxons Rest controversy 
In 2009 Cricklade Town Council (with help from Cricklade Bloomers) built a town garden on an open space near Waylands called Saxons Rest, which included two large flagpoles. This caused controversy among residents of the High Street, who considered their view across the open space would be spoilt and there would be noise from the halyards on the poles. The build went ahead despite a significant number signing a petition against it. The majority of opinion was against the flagpoles, considering them a needless and pretentious feature. Once built, the consensus became that it was an attractive feature and enhanced the area. The overriding feeling had been that the town's funds would be better directed elsewhere, for instance to prevention of crime and vandalism in the town, which was rising. The open space behind the garden is a scheduled monument, as this is the location of the Saxon town walls, although they are no longer visible.

Business and economy

Cricklade Business Association represents the local business community and has close links with other non-profit organisations, such as the Rotarians, the Waylands Trust, and the charity that runs the leisure centre.

Cricklade's many public houses include the Vale, the Old Bear, the White Hart, and the Red Lion. Drinks are also sold at the White Horse Members' Club and the leisure centre. An above-average proportion of the ward population ward was retired at the time of the 2011 census.

There is a local museum in Calcutt Street run by the Cricklade Historical Society, housed in a former Baptist chapel. T. R. Thomson of Costorphine was a long-time resident of Cricklade and a moving spirit behind the establishment of the society. His book Materials for a History of Cricklade and various articles have enhanced the study of local history in the town.

Notable people
In birth date order:
Robert of Cricklade (c. 1100 – c. 1174–1179) was a teacher and later prominent writer based in Cirencester Abbey and the Priory of St Frideswide, Oxford.
John Hungerford (c. 1566–1635) was a politician whose interest in Cricklade led him to build the market house in the High Street and a flying buttress for the Lady Chapel of St Sampson's Church.
Robert Jenner (1584–1651), merchant and politician, founded a school in Cricklade and was buried here.
Nevil Maskelyne (1611–1679), was a landowner and MP for Cricklade. He gained the town a weekly market and four fairs a year from 1662.
George R. Poulton (born 1828), the American composer of the song "Aura", was born here.
Reginald Arkell (1882–1959), scriptwriter, novelist and humorist, died here.
Ellis Peters (1913–1995), set her medieval mystery novel Brother Cadfael's Penance in Cricklade.
Francis Maddison (1927–2006), historian and Arabist, directed archaeological excavations in Cricklade.

Transport
The Thames Path runs through Cricklade then continues downstream on the south bank to Eysey Footbridge, where it crosses to the other bank.

The North Wilts Canal, opened in 1819, passed to the west of the town, linking the Thames and Severn Canal with the Wilts and Berks Canal. Abandoned in the early 20th century, parts are now being restored. The Town Bridge, built in 1812, marks the limits of navigation rights on the River Thames.

Cricklade railway station on the Midland and South Western Junction Railway linked Swindon with Cirencester, but was closed in 1961 and no trace of the station remains. Part of the railway route forms a cycle path (National Cycle Route 45). South of the town, the Swindon and Cricklade Railway is restoring the line as a leisure facility. Since 2007 passenger trains have been run between Blunsdon and Hayes Knoll, and in 2014 the line was extended to Taw Valley Halt on the edge of Swindon. It is also being extended towards Cricklade. The nearest station to Cricklade at present is Hayes Knoll.

The A419 Swindon to Cirencester road bypasses the town to the north-east.

See also
Cricklade (UK Parliament constituency) (1295–1918)

References

Further reading

External links

 
Populated places established in the 9th century
Populated places on the River Thames
Towns in Wiltshire
Civil parishes in Wiltshire